Mapia is an extinct Micronesian language of Indonesia. It was spoken on Mapia Atoll, 180 km north of the coast of West Papua. The population emigrated early in the 20th century the only speaker as of 2000 was an elderly man who had remained behind on the island. The rest of the population of Mapia are now Biak-speaking immigrants.

References

Chuukic languages
Languages of western New Guinea
Extinct languages of Oceania
Languages extinct in the 20th century